Photos of Ghosts is the third studio album and the first English language record by the Italian progressive rock band Premiata Forneria Marconi, also known as PFM. Released in the U.S. in October 1973, it was the first album by an Italian rock group to appear on the American charts. The album peaked at No. 180 on the Billboard 200 albums chart in November 1973.

PFM was discovered by Greg Lake of Emerson, Lake & Palmer while on an Italian tour. The band was signed to Manticore Records, a label created by ELP, soon after. Five of seven songs on this album have new lyrics (not translations) written by former King Crimson lyricist Peter Sinfield. Sinfield produced the new recording and mixing at Command Studios in London.

The best known song from this album, "Celebration", had significant airplay on FM Album-oriented rock stations across the U.S. and Canada. It was originally recorded in 1971 as "È festa" for PFM's first album, Storia di un minuto.  The album includes a new instrumental titled "Old Rain". Photos of Ghosts includes the entirety of PFM's second album Per un amico (1972). Four of those five recordings have new English lyrics. "Mr. 9 'til 5" was originally an instrumental titled "Generale". "Il Banchetto" ("The Banquet") is a remixed version of the Italian track from Per un amico.

Track listing

Personnel 
 Franco Mussida – vocals, electric and acoustic guitar, 12 string guitar, theorbo, mandocello
 Flavio Premoli – spinet, keyboards, Hammond organ, Minimoog, Mellotron, tubular bells, harpsichord, piano, vocals
 Mauro Pagani – flute, piccolo, violin, vocals
 Giorgio Piazza – bass guitar, vocals
 Franz Di Cioccio – drums, percussion, vocals
 Peter Sinfield - English lyrics, producer

Charts

References

Premiata Forneria Marconi albums
1973 albums
Manticore Records albums